Bzzz or Bzz may refer to:

Bzzz
 Bzzz, a cross-linguistic onomatopoeia (the sound of a bee buzzing)
 Bzzz!, a relationship game show
 Bzzz!, an exhibit from Copernicus Science Centre
 Bzzz, a Gaelic children's television series
 "Bzzz", an episode of Zoboomafoo

Bzz
 "Bzz..", a song by Bzikebi
 RAF Brize Norton, IATA code BZZ

See also

Bee, an insect that makes a bzzz sound
Wasp, an insect that makes a bzzz sound
 Bzzzpeek, a website designed to appeal young children

 Buzz (disambiguation)
 BZ (disambiguation)
 Zzz (disambiguation)